Shri Krishan Institute of Engineering and Technology is a private engineering institute in Kurukshetra, Haryana, India.

History 
The institute was established in 1997 by a group of professionals and industrialists.

The institute has labs, a library and computer center, and has been awarded the National Gold Star Award in 2003 by the International Institute of Education and Management, New Delhi.

Staff 
 Director: Prof.  Manoj Tiwari
 Principal: Dr. H.V Manchanda

Courses 
.

Facilities

Computer Center 
The College has a 52 Mbps Wi-Fi Campus .

Library 
The institute has a library housing books, technology and academic resources. It has books, journals, video learning resources, and an electronic database.

Hostel 
The institute has hostel facilities both for boys and girl. There is an on campus boy’s  and girl's hostel.

Extracurricular activities

Activities 
The institute organizes programs cultural and technical. Athletic meet for students is organised on campus.

Sports 
The institute provides play grounds for volleyball, basketball, football, cricket, table tennis, a hall and a gymnasium.

Annual Festivals 
 Krotaux is an inter-college technical festival organised by the students of SKIET. It attracts students from north India. Other events organised by students are LAN Gaming, Cyber Quest, Mech Quest and Electro Quest.
 Fusion - Annual Intra College Cultural Festival organised by the students of SKIET.

References

External links 
 Official website

Engineering colleges in Haryana
Engineering colleges in India by city